is a Japanese actress and singer who is represented by the talent agency Horipro. She attended Hosei University as an undergraduate student.

Filmography

TV series

Film

Dubbing

Awards

References

External links
 Official profile 
  
 

1991 births
Living people
People from Higashiōsaka
Actresses from Osaka Prefecture
Musicians from Osaka Prefecture
Asadora lead actors
Hosei University alumni
21st-century Japanese singers
21st-century Japanese women singers